The Funariaceae are a family of mosses in the order Funariales.  About 303 species are included in the family, with 200 species in Funaria and another 80 classified in Physcomitrium.

The genus Goniomitrium has been recently moved from the Pottiaceae to the Funariaceae.

References

Moss families
Funariales